This is a list of the horse breeds considered to originate wholly or partly in six Central Asian countries: Afghanistan, Kazakhstan, Kyrgyzstan, Tajikistan, Turkmenistan and Uzbekistan. Some may have complex or obscure histories, so inclusion here does not necessarily imply that a breed is predominantly or exclusively from those countries.

References

 
 
 
 
 
 
Horse